The Britam Tower is a commercial building in Nairobi owned by British-American Investments Company (Britam). The building features a unique prismic shape, that starts as an equal four sided square footprint and ends with a two sided roof with a  mast, containing three helical wind turbines.

Location
The tower is located along Hospital Road, in the Upper Hill neighborhood of Nairobi, Kenya's capital and largest city. The geographical coordinates of Britam Tower are 01°18'00.0"S, 36°48'47.0"E (Latitude:-1.300000; Longitude:36.813056).

Overview
The building is the international headquarters of Britam. It also serves as the regional headquarters of the business conglomerate in East and Central Africa. To cater to its many tenants, the building has an attached 12 Storey Car Park that  can accommodate  up to 1,000 vehicles.

Recent developments
In July 2018, nearly one year after the building was completed, Britam, the skyscraper's owner-developer, began letting the building to prospective tenants. The target clientele are financial institutions, diplomatic missions, private companies and multinational corporations.

References

External links

Profile At Skyscrapercenter.com

Skyscraper office buildings in Kenya
Buildings and structures in Nairobi
Office buildings completed in 2017
2017 establishments in Kenya